Louis Kohmueller House, also known as the Fred Kohmueller House, is a historic home located at Washington, Franklin County, Missouri. It was built about 1878, and is a one-story, brick dwelling on a stone foundation.  It has a side-gable roof and segmental arched door and window openings.  Attached to the house by a low-pitched shed roof is a -story smoke house.  Also on the property is the contributing large frame barn (c. 1908).

It was listed on the National Register of Historic Places in 2000.

References

Houses on the National Register of Historic Places in Missouri
Houses completed in 1878
Buildings and structures in Franklin County, Missouri
National Register of Historic Places in Franklin County, Missouri